Big J TV is a 24-hour multilingual Christian evangelical television station based in Udupi.

Programmes 
 Divyavani
 Amrithavani
 Vonde Mrga Ministry
 Karuna Sadan Ministries

See also
Media in Karnataka

References 

Television stations in Karnataka
Konkani-language television stations
Marathi-language television channels
Kannada-language television channels